The Mulungushi River in central Zambia is a tributary of the Lunsemfwa River and a part of the Zambezi River basin. It rises on the plateau north-west of Kabwe and flows south-east into the Luangwa Rift Valley where it joins the Lunsemfwa.

The river is the site of the Mulungushi Dam, and its name has become a symbol of Zambia's independence through the Mulungushi Rock of Authority.

See also 
List of rivers of Zambia

References

Rivers of Zambia